Ha Ha Ha is the second studio album by Australian singer-songwriter Natalie Gauci. The album's jazz-oriented sound is a significant departure from Gauci's earlier pop roots. In early 2013, the album was removed from the iTunes Store for reasons unclear.

Track listing

References

2012 albums
Natalie Gauci albums